Fatima Rainey (born 24 July 1967) is a Swedish pop singer.

Rainey has released two studio albums through Warner Music Group of Japan. She was married to the Swedish actor and stand-up comedian Claes Malmberg.

Her 1998 song "Hey" became a huge hit in South Africa and still popular till today. Also a dance hit in the Philippines.

Discography

Albums
1997: Love Is a Wonderful Thing
2001: Celebration

Compilations 
1997: The Remix Collection

Singles
1997: "Love Is a Wonderful Thing"
1997: "I Gave You the Best" (Remix)
1997: "Find Our Way Back"
1998: "Hey"

References

External links
 Warner Music Japan discography
 Interview with Fatima Rainey 

1967 births
Living people
Swedish pop singers
Swedish women singers
English-language singers from Sweden